AB Bank Zambia is a commercial bank in Zambia, licensed by the Bank of Zambia and by the national banking regulator. It is a member of AccessHolding, a banking group which operates a network of commercial banks and microfinance institutions in developing and transition countries with a target group focus on micro, small and medium-sized enterprises.

Main Location
The headquarters of AccessBank Zambia are located on Chainda Place, in Lusaka, the capital and largest city in the country. The coordinates of the bank's headquarters are: 15°25'23.0"S, 28°17'01.0"E (Latitude:-15.423053; Longitude:28.283612).

Overview
The bank began operations on 18 October 2011, following the issuance of a commercial banking license by the Bank of Zambia. The bank's shareholders are five international development institutions. The target clientele of the bank are Zambian micro, small and medium-sized businesses, who have been left out of the formal economy by the traditional commercial banks. The bank also targets low income earners in the country. The bank maintains a facility for small-scale farmers.

Shareholding
The shareholding in the stock of the bank, is as illustrated in the table below:

Note: Incofin is an international development fund that invests in microfinance institutions that serve under-served populations, especially those serving agricultural communities.

Branches
As of April 2016, the bank maintains branches at the following locations:

 Cairo Road Branch - Chainda Place, Off Cairo Road, Lusaka Main Branch
 Chilenje Branch - Chilenje Shopping Mall, Muraba Road, Chilenje, Lusaka
 Matero Branch - B & J Building, Commonwealth Road, Matero, Lusaka
 Kalingalinga Branch - Alick Nkhata Road, Kalingalinga
 Chelston Branch - Chelston Bazzar Complex, Chelston
 Garden Branch - Garden Township, Lusaka.
 Kitwe Branch - Kitwe

See also
 AccessHolding
 List of banks in Zambia

References

Banks of Zambia
Companies based in Lusaka